Operation Cosmos provided navigational aids for, and was prepared to render emergency assistance to, U.S. President Dwight D. Eisenhower's plane as the Chief Executive crossed the Pacific Ocean on a good will tour in 1960.

References

Example of use 

 USS Haverfield (DE-393)

Non-combat military operations involving the United States